Sycamore Canyon may refer to:

United States
Arizona
 Sycamore Canyon (Cochise County, Arizona), a canyon near Fort Huachuca
 Sycamore Canyon (Gila County, Arizona), a canyon near the Salt River Canyon Wilderness
 Sycamore Canyon (Pima County, Arizona), a canyon in the Pusch Ridge Wilderness Area
 Sycamore Canyon (Pinal County, Arizona), a canyon next to the Little Table Mountains
 Sycamore Canyon (Yavapai County, Arizona), a canyon in the Sycamore Canyon Wilderness

California
 Sycamore Canyon (Kern County, California), a canyon near Millersville, California
 Sycamore Canyon (San Diego County, California), a canyon near Dulzura, California
 Sycamore Canyon (Ventura County, California), a canyon in the Santa Monica Mountains in Newbury Park, California

Texas
 Sycamore Canyon (Texas), a canyon in Val Verde County, Texas

See also
 Sycamore Canyon Test Facility